Lennoxtown railway station served the town of Lennoxtown, Dunbartonshire, Scotland from 1848 to 1881 on the Blane Valley Railway.

History 
The station opened as Lennoxtown on 5 July 1848 as Lennoxtown by the North British Railway. It had a trainshed on the east side and a goods yard which was on both sides of the approaching line. The station's name was changed to Lennoxtown (Old) on 1 July 1867 when  opened in the same year. This station remained open until 1 October 1881.

References 

Railway stations in Great Britain opened in 1848
Railway stations in Great Britain closed in 1881
Former North British Railway stations
1848 establishments in Scotland
1881 disestablishments in Scotland